Calamity Anne's Beauty is a 1913 American silent short Western comedy film directed by Allan Dwan and starring Louise Lester as Calamity Anne.

Other cast
 Charlotte Burton
 J. Warren Kerrigan
 Phyllis Gordon
 Jack Richardson
 Jessalyn Van Trump

External links
 

1913 films
1913 short films
1913 comedy films
1910s Western (genre) comedy films
American silent short films
1910s English-language films
American black-and-white films
Beauty
American comedy short films
Silent American Western (genre) comedy films
Films directed by Allan Dwan
1910s American films